Members of Polish national Parliament (Sejm) elected from Kraków constituency (2005 election) include: 
Andrzej Adamczyk, (Law and Justice)
Bogusław Bosak, (Law and Justice)
Barbara Bubula, (Law and Justice)
Kazimierz Chrzanowski, (Democratic Left Alliance)
Jerzy Feliks Fedorowicz, (Civic Platform)
Marek Bolesław Kotlinowski, (League of Polish Families)
Jacek Krupa, (Civic Platform)
Ireneusz Raś, (Civic Platform)
Jan Maria Rokita, (Civic Platform)
Monika Ryniak, (Law and Justice)
Tomasz Szczypiński, (Civic Platform)
Zbigniew Wassermann, (Law and Justice)
Zbigniew Ziobro, (Law and Justice).

References

Sejm